Richard Gautier (October 30, 1931 – January 13, 2017) was an American actor, comedian, singer, and caricaturist. He was known for his television roles as Hymie the Robot in the television series Get Smart, and Robin Hood in the TV comedy series When Things Were Rotten, as well as for originating the role of Conrad Birdie in the Broadway musical Bye Bye Birdie.

Career

Early career
Gautier started his career as a nightclub comic and a singer; he joined ASCAP in 1959 after serving in the United States Navy. In 1960, he portrayed fictional rock 'n roll star Conrad Birdie in the original Broadway theatre production of Bye Bye Birdie, receiving a Tony Award nomination for his performance. He would later appear with two of his Birdie stars in two films: with Kay Medford in Ensign Pulver in 1964, and with Dick Van Dyke in Divorce American Style in 1967.

Game show panelist
During the 1970s and 1980s, Gautier was a frequent game show panelist, appearing on Match Game; Family Feud; Tattletales; Showoffs; You Don't Say!; Liar's Club; Password Plus; Body Language; Super Password; Win, Lose or Draw; and the TV version of Can You Top This?

Batman
In 1973, when Burt Ward and Yvonne Craig reprised their Batman roles (as Robin and Batgirl, respectively) for a TV public service announcement about equal pay for women, Adam West, who was trying to distance himself from the Batman role at the time, declined to participate.  Gautier filled in for West as Batman on this occasion.

Voice-over roles
Gautier performed several voice-over roles in animation, including Rodimus Prime in the third season of The Transformers animated series from 1986 to 1987, as well as Serpentor in the G.I. Joe series, Louis from the 1986 cartoon Foofur, Spike the Dog in Tom & Jerry Kids, some additional voices in Hanna-Barbera's The New Yogi Bear Show, Wooly Smurf in The Smurfs, and several voices for Inhumanoids, including Crygen and Pyre and their combined form, Magnakor.

Celebrity caricatures
Gautier was known for his caricatures of celebrities and wrote several instructional books on caricature, drawing, and cartooning.

Personal life
Gautier was first married to Beverly J. Gerber; the marriage ended in divorce after they had three children together. He was divorced from his second wife, actress Barbara Stuart, and his final marriage was to Tess Hightower, a psychologist. He had three children, Chrissie, Randy, and Denise, and six grandchildren as well as a stepdaughter, Jennifer and her two children. 

His son Randy, nicknamed Rand, had both a brief stint in pornography under the name Austin Moore, and would in 1995 steal a videotape from the home of Tommy Lee and Pamela Anderson, containing footage they had filmed of themselves having sex while on vacation. Rand, along with a distributor, released it on the Internet, and it became one of the first widespread celebrity sex tapes.

Gautier died on January 13, 2017, at an assisted living facility in Arcadia, California, following a long illness.

Filmography

Bibliography

References

External links

 
 
 

1931 births
2017 deaths
American caricaturists
American male film actors
American male television actors
American male voice actors
American male musical theatre actors
American male comedians
Comedians from California
Male actors from Los Angeles
Military personnel from California
United States Navy sailors